The flag, that serves as the symbol of the city of Zielona Góra, Lubusz Voivodeship, in western Poland, is divided into three fields, including the vertical yellow stripe on the left, and two equally-sized horizontal stripes, white on the top, and green on the bottom, on the right. It was established in 1965.

Design 
The flag of the city of Zielona Góra is divided into three fields. To the left, the flag has a vertical yellow stripe, which length equals 1/3 of the flag's. To the right, it is divided into two equally-sized horizontal stripes, white on the top, and green on the bottom. Theirs length equals 2/3 of the flag's. The flag proportions have the aspect ratio of its height to its wight equal 5:8

The yellow stripe symbolized the historical allegiance of the city to Silesian Piast dynasty that ruled the area in the High Middle Ages, and whose coat of arms contained yellow colour, as a background. The white stripe symbolizes the long textile industry tradition of the city, and the green stripe, its Winemaking and wine grapes harvest traditions.

History 
The flag was established by the City Countil on 16 September 1965, making it one of the oldest city flags of Poland. Originally, the flags proportions were equal 1:2, but were later altered to 5:8.

References 

Zielona Gora
Zielona Góra
Zielona Gora
1965 establishments in Poland

pl:Flaga Zielonej Góry